"I Wanna Know" is a song by Swedish production duo NOTD, featuring vocals of American singer-songwriter Bea Miller. The song was released by ToWonder and Universal Music Group on 16 March 2018, through streaming and digital download formats. "I Wanna Know" was produced by the duo, and written by them alongside Shy Martin, Shy Nodi, and Jason Gill. The music video for the track was released on 14 May 2019, and was directed by Michael Baldwin, and produced by Jack Lightfoot.

Formats and track listings

Digital download
"I Wanna Know" – 3:17

Digital download – Acoustic
"I Wanna Know"  – 3:20

Digital download – Remixes EP
"I Wanna Know"  – 2:59
"I Wanna Know"  – 3:24

Charts

Weekly charts

Year-end charts

Certifications

References

External links
 
 

2018 singles
2018 songs
NOTD songs
Bea Miller songs
Songs written by Jason Gill (musician)
Songs written by Shy Martin
Universal Music Group singles